is a Japanese seismologist who has made fundamental contributions to understanding the physics of earthquakes and the tectonic processes that cause them.

Career 
Kanamori and American seismologist Thomas C. Hanks developed the moment magnitude scale which replaced the Richter magnitude scale as a measurement of the relative strength of earthquakes.

Kanamori invented the method for calculating slip distribution on the fault plane by teleseismic waveform with Masayuki Kikuchi. In addition, they studied realtime seismology.

In 2007 he was awarded the Kyoto Prize in Basic Sciences.

Kanamori developed a new method of earthquake early warning detection by rapid analysis of the P-wave by a robust network. The algorithm is currently being tested with the Southern California Seismic Network "ShakeAlert" Earthquake Early Warning (EEW) system, and is one of three algorithms that is used by the system.

Honours 
1993 Arthur L. Day Prize and Lectureship
1994 Asahi Prize
1996 Walter H. Bucher Medal
2004 Japan Academy Prize
2006 Person of Cultural Merit
2007 Kyoto Prize
2014 William Bowie Medal

Selected publications

See also
List of geophysicists

References 

1936 births
Living people
People from Tokyo
University of Tokyo alumni
Academic staff of the University of Tokyo
California Institute of Technology faculty
Japanese emigrants to the United States
Japanese seismologists
Kyoto laureates in Basic Sciences
Foreign associates of the National Academy of Sciences